Torrie is a given name and surname. Notable people with the name include:

Given name
 Torrie Cox (born 1980), American football player
 Torrie Groening (born 1961), Canadian photographer
 Torrie Robertson (born 1961), Canadian ice hockey player
 Torrie Wilson (born 1975), American professional wrestler and entertainer

Middle name
 Walter Torrie Forrest (1880 – 1917), Scottish rugby union player and British Army officer

Nickname/Psseudonym
 Torrie Zito, nickname for Salvatore Zito (1933 – 2009), American pianist, music arranger, composer and conductor
 Malcolm Torrie, a pseudonyms for Gladys Mitchell (1901 – 1983), English author

Surname
 Pamela Torrie maiden name of Pamela Carruthers (1916 – 2009), British equestrian
 Thomas Jameson Torrie (died 1858) was a Scottish geologist and botanist

See also

 Torrey (name), given name and surname
 Terrie
 Torie
 Torre (name)
 Torri (disambiguation)